Elizabeth Spence James (born 17 September 1944) is a retired international lawn bowls player from eSwatini who was the 2003 World Singles Champion of Champions and began bowling in 1977.

Bowls career

World Championships
James has competed for Swaziland (called eSwatini today) at four World Bowls Championships in 1981, 1985, 1992 and 1996. James has represented Swaziland at four Commonwealth Games in 1986, 1990, 1994 and 2006. In 2003 she became the World Singles Champion of Champions defeating Alison Merrien of Guernsey in the final.

References

External links
 
 

1944 births
Living people
Swazi bowls players
Commonwealth Games competitors for Eswatini
Bowls players at the 1986 Commonwealth Games
Bowls players at the 1990 Commonwealth Games
Bowls players at the 1994 Commonwealth Games
Bowls players at the 2006 Commonwealth Games